Rederiet (High Seas or The Shipping Company) was a (318 episodes) Swedish soap opera that aired on Sveriges Television between August 1992 and April 2002. The cast featured many popular and renowned Swedish actors.

The 45-minute episodes were broadcast weekly on Thursday nights on the public-service channel SVT1 and normally had between one and two million viewers. For ten years, Rederiet was the number-one rated show on Swedish television, along with the rival TV4 show Tre Kronor. The competition for viewers can be compared to that between Dynasty and Dallas.

Rederiet also gained popularity in Finland on Yle TV2, and the show was a hit in Norway too on TV2. The first season of the show was also sold to Egypt. The later seasons of the series were produced in collaboration with YLE, which led most notably to Finnish actor Åke Lindman appearing in the series. Rapper Ken Ring also appeared as an extra in the show in 1996.

On April Fools' Day 1993 SVT News announced that Mel Gibson was to play a lead role in the series. Gibson himself was interviewed and confirmed the information. It was later revealed that the whole event had been a joke.

Plot
The story is about a shipping company which conducts cruiseferry traffic on the Baltic Sea between Stockholm, Sweden and Turku, Finland. It takes place on board MS Freja, the exterior of which was portrayed in the series by the Finnish registered MS Birka Princess. In the series the ship has different funnel colours from the ones in real life; in reality they were blue, yellow and red but in the series they were retouched to appear as different shades of blue. The show follows life on board the ship, mostly focusing on the crew and captain, but also on some of the passengers. The plot often involves love, breakups, accidents, deaths, murders, smuggling, theft, arson, rape, drugs, and insanity.

Another part of the story takes place on land, following the life of the Dahléns, the family who owns and runs the shipping company. There are also rival companies who try to gain control over the company, which leads to a constant struggle for power.

Characters
Here is a list of the characters in Rederiet:

Impact on popular culture
On 1 April 2018, the Swedish Star Trek fansite "Star Trek databas" announced, as an April Fool, that CBS had confirmed the series to be set in the same primary fictional universe as Star Trek, and that because of the major costs for a space opera series, the setting was instead changed to a seafaring ship on Earth.

See also
List of Rederiet episodes

References

External links 

1992 Swedish television series debuts
2002 Swedish television series endings
Baltic Sea in fiction
Swedish television soap operas